German submarine U-401 was a Type VIIC U-boat of Nazi Germany's Kriegsmarine during World War II.

She carried out one patrol. She sank or damaged no ships.

She was sunk in mid-Atlantic on 3 August 1941 by Allied warships.

Design
German Type VIIC submarines were preceded by the shorter Type VIIB submarines. U-401 had a displacement of  when at the surface and  while submerged. She had two shafts and two  propellers.

U-401 was fitted with five  torpedo tubes (four fitted at the bow and one at the stern), fourteen torpedoes, one  SK C/35 naval gun, 220 rounds, and a  C/30 anti-aircraft gun. The boat had a complement of between forty-four and sixty.

Service history
The submarine was laid down on 8 April 1940 at the Danziger Werft (yard) at Danzig (now Gdansk) as yard number 102, launched on 16 December and commissioned on 10 April under the command of Kapitänleutnant Gero Zimmermann.

She served with the 1st U-boat Flotilla from 10 April 1941 (training) and stayed with that organization from 1 July until her loss.

The boat's only patrol was preceded by the short journey from Königsberg (Kaliningrad) to Trondheim.

Patrol and loss
U-401 departed Trondheim on 9 July 1941. On 3 August she was sunk by depth charges dropped from the British destroyer , the Norwegian-crewed destroyer  and the British corvette .

Forty-five men died in U-401; there were no survivors.

References

Bibliography

External links

German Type VIIC submarines
U-boats commissioned in 1941
U-boats sunk in 1941
U-boats sunk by depth charges
1940 ships
Ships built in Danzig
Ships lost with all hands
U-boats sunk by British warships
U-boats sunk by Norwegian warships
World War II submarines of Germany
World War II shipwrecks in the Atlantic Ocean
Maritime incidents in August 1941